Oldenburgische Landesbank AG (OLB) is a private financial institution based in the northwest of Germany. Its headquarters are in Oldenburg.

OLB was founded in 1869 by the Frankfurt bank Erlanger & Söhne with the privilege of issuing banknotes. Their first director was Lorenz Zuckermandel. The business areas of the universal bank today include private clients business including private banking and wealth management, corporate and commercial clients business, specialized lending, for example in the area of commercial real estate or acquisition financing, and also the brokerage of real estate, building society contracts and insurance.

OLB maintains a wide network of locations, which focuses on the northwestern part of Germany, known as Weser-Ems (comprising Osnabrück Land, Emsland, County of Bentheim, East Frisia, Ammerland, Friesland, Oldenburg (Oldenburg), and Oldenburg Münsterland), as well as Bremen (opened 1 July 2009), and previously Bremerhaven (opened 4 October 2010) and Verden (opened 4 April 2011). Its first branch in North Rhine-Westphalia opened 7 November 2011 in Rheine.

Currently, OLB has 40 branches offering personal advice and 16 self-service branches (as of 31 December 2022). The bank bundles its advisory services at larger locations, the 16 so called centres of competence throught Northwestern Germany, while at the same time further expanding the contact channels telephone and internet.

OLB has reorganised its business activities with regard to target customers, products and services as of 2022. The first main pillar is the system bank business with private customers and regional business with small and medium-sized corporate customers. Here, the bank focuses on a multi-channel approach in combination with regional branch networks and a nationwide digital presence. The services offered are based on lean and automated processes. This kind of bank business has been assigned to the new "Private & Business Customers" business segment since 2022.

The second pillar of the business model is the more manufacturing business. This includes the larger-volume corporate business, football financing and specialized lending with a focus on acquisition financing and commercial real estate financing. The focus here is on an individually tailored profile, larger individual transactions and a greater use of resources in advisory and processing services in order to achieve higher margins. The activities assigned to this kind of bank business have been combined in the "Corporates & Diversified Lending" business segment since 2022. 

On 23 June 2017, Bremer Kreditbank AG acquired a majority stake in OLB from Allianz. Bremer Kreditbank was a portfolio company of the private equity firm Apollo.  The parent company Bremer Kreditbank was merged with OLB in 2018.

Board of Managing Directors
 Stefan Barth (Chairman)
 Dr. Rainer Polster
 Chris Eggert
 Aytac Aydin
 Marc Ampaw
 Giacomo Petrobelli

References

External links 
 OLB
 OLB - BaFin
 

Former central banks
Companies based in Lower Saxony
Oldenburg Land
Banks established in 1868
1860s establishments in the Grand Duchy of Oldenburg
German companies established in 1868